Ionescuellum is a genus of proturans in the family Hesperentomidae, found in Europe.

Species
 Ionescuellum carpaticum (Ionesco, 1930)
 Ionescuellum condei (Nosek, 1965)
 Ionescuellum haybachae (Nosek, 1967)
 Ionescuellum montanum (Gisin, 1945)
 Ionescuellum pseudocarpaticum (Nosek, 1986)
 Ionescuellum schusteri (Nosek, 1977)
 Ionescuellum silvaticum (Rusek, 1965)
 Ionescuellum ulmiacum Rusek & Stumpp, 1989

References

Protura